Bonini's paradox, named after Stanford business professor Charles Bonini, explains the difficulty in constructing models or simulations that fully capture the workings of complex systems (such as the human brain).

Statements
In modern discourse, the paradox was articulated by John M. Dutton and William H. Starbuck: "As a model of a complex system becomes more complete, it becomes less understandable. Alternatively, as a model grows more realistic, it also becomes just as difficult to understand as the real-world processes it represents."

This paradox may be used by researchers to explain why complete models of the human brain and thinking processes have not been created and will undoubtedly remain difficult for years to come.

This same paradox was observed earlier from a quote by philosopher-poet Paul Valéry: "Ce qui est simple est toujours faux. Ce qui ne l’est pas est inutilisable". ("If it's simple, it's always false. If it's not, it's unusable.")

Also, the same topic has been discussed by Richard Levins in his classic essay "The Strategy of Model Building in Population Biology", in stating that complex models have 'too many parameters to measure, leading to analytically insoluble equations that would exceed the capacity of our computers, but the results would have no meaning for us even if they could be solved.

Related issues
Bonini's paradox can be seen as a case of the map–territory relation: simpler maps are less accurate though more useful representations of the territory. An extreme form is given in the fictional stories Sylvie and Bruno Concluded and "On Exactitude in Science", which imagine a map of a scale of 1:1 (the same size as the territory), which is precise but unusable, illustrating one extreme of Bonini's paradox.
Isaac Asimov's fictional science of "Psychohistory" in his Foundation series also faces with this dilemma; Asimov even had one of his psychohistorians discuss the paradox.

See also

References

Paradoxes